The AN/MRN-1 was an instrument approach localizer used by the Army Air Force during and after World War II. It was standardized on 3 July 1942. It replaced the SCR-241, and was a component of SCS-51.

Use
The transmitter provides a signal to guide the RC-103 equipped aircraft to the centerline of a runway. The set radiates two intersecting field patterns, one of which is modulated at an audio frequency of 90 cycles per second, and the other at an audio frequency of 150 cycles per second. The shape of the radiated patterns is such that they intersect in a vertical plane called the "course", which can be oriented (by positioning the truck) to intersect the ground in a line which coincides with the center-line of a landing runway. The range of the equipment is a function of the elevation of the receiving antenna: approximately 40 miles at an elevation of 2,500 feet, 70 miles at 6,000 feet, and 100 miles at 10,000 feet. The transmitter, BC-751-A has a frequency range from 108.3 to 110.3 Mc. power output is 25 Watts.
AN/CRN-3 is the same equipment except without the K-53 truck, thereby making it air transportable, components are housed in a tent.

Components 
The AN/MRN-1 is mounted in a K-53 truck and is made up of the following components.
 BC-915 control box
 BC-751 radio transmitter
 BC-752 Modulator and bridge
 BC-753 course detector fixed
 BC-754 course detector portable
 BC-755 field intensity meter
 BC-777 indicator (alarm)
 RC-109 antenna (5 alford loops in a horizontal plane)
 An SCR-610 is provided for ground communications
 power is provided by a PE-141 generator (115 volts)

Aircraft components
The RC-103-A is an airborne localizer receiver used to indicate a landing course in conjunction with the AAF instrument approach system. signals received from a transmitter, located at one end of the runway to be used, are fed into the cross-pointer indicator to indicate "on course", "fly right" or "fly left". Audio indication is also provided.
Antenna system AS-27/ARN-5 is used with the dual installation of the localizer and glide path receivers. Antenna AN-100 is used when only the localizer receiver is installed in the aircraft.
 RC-103 components include
 Indicator I-101-C
 BC-732 control box
 BC-733 Receiver W/ DM-53 Dynamotor
 AN-100 Antenna (localizer only)
 AS-27/ARN-5 Antenna system (combination)

See also
 AN/CRN-2
 AN/MRN-2
 AN/MRN-3
 Instrument landing system
 List of military electronics of the United States
 List of U.S. Signal Corps vehicles
 LORAN
 Radio navigation
 SCR-277
 SHORAN
 Signal Corps Radio

References
 TM 11-227 Signal Communication Directory. Dated 10 April 1944.
 TM 11-487 Electrical Communication systems Equipment. Dated 2 October 1944.
 Graphic Survey of Radio and Radar Equipment Used by the Army Airforce. Section 3, Radio Navigation Equipment. Dated May 1945.
 TO 30-100F-1. Dated 1943.

Further reading

External links
 http://www.footnote.com/image/#46938757 exterior
 http://aafcollection.info/items/documents/view.php?file=000149-01-03.pdf TO 30-100F-1 1943
 http://www.designation-systems.net/usmilav/jetds/an-c.html
 http://www.flightglobal.com/pdfarchive/view/1949/1949%20-%200728.html SCS-51
 http://aafradio.org/NASM/RHAntennas.htm antenna systems
 http://jproc.ca/rrp/rrp3/argus_bc733d.jpg BC-733

Military radio systems of the United States
Equipment of the United States Air Force
World War II American electronics
Air traffic control
Radio navigation
Surveying
Wireless locating
History of radio
Military equipment introduced from 1940 to 1944